As of end of 4 December 2022

The following is a list of records and statistics of the FA Women's Super League (FA WSL) — the highest level of women's football in England — since its inception in 2011. Barring total appearances, all statistics do not include the 2017 FA WSL Spring Series, which bridged the gap between the 2016 and 2017–18 season, featuring only 8 games for each team. Many league record team statistics (such as those related to points, goals, wins and losses) only cover 22 and 14 game seasons, as they have been featured in the league at least more than once.

The following lists the season lengths of all seasons of the WSL thus far:

 22 game seasons: 2020–21, 2021–22, 2022–23
 15 game season: 2019–20 - this season was cut short due to the COVID-19 pandemic
 20 game season: 2018–19
 18 game seasons: 2017–18
 16 game seasons: 2016
 14 game seasons: 2011, 2012, 2013, 2014, 2015

League Records

Titles 

 Most titles: 5, Chelsea (2015, 2017–18, 2019–20, 2020–21, 2021–22) 
 Most consecutive title wins: 3
 Chelsea (2019–20, 2020–21, 2021–22)
 Biggest title-winning margin: 7 points, Arsenal (2018–19)
 Smallest title-winning margin: 0 points, +2 goal difference (2014); Liverpool (+9) over Chelsea (+7). Both finished on 26 points, but Liverpool won the title on goal difference. Excluding the 2017 FA WSL Spring Series, it is the only time the FA WSL has been decided on goal difference.
 Winning a title with most remaining games: 1, Arsenal (2012, 2018–19)

Points 

 Most points in a season:
 In a 22 game season: 57, Chelsea (2020–21)
 In a 14 game season: 36, Liverpool (2013)
 Most home points in a season: 
 In a 22 game season: 31, Chelsea, Arsenal (2021–22)  
 In a 14 game season: 18, Liverpool (2013) 
 Most away points in a season: 
 In a 22 game season: 27, Arsenal (2018–19), Chelsea (2020–21)
 In a 14 game season: 18, Liverpool (2013) 
 Most points without winning the league: 
 In a 22 game season: 55, Manchester City (2020–21), Arsenal (2021–22)
 In a 14 game season: 31, Bristol Academy (2013) 
 Fewest points in a season: 
 In a 22 game season: 11, Birmingham City (2021–22)
 In a 14 game season: 4, Everton (2014)
 Fewest home points in a season: 
 In a 22 game season: 4, Birmingham City (2020–21), (2021–22)
 In a 14 game season: 3, Everton (2014)
 Fewest away points in a season: 
 In a 22 game season: 3, Leicester City (2021–22)
 In a 14 game season: 1, Everton (2014)
 Fewest points in a season while winning the league: 
 In a 22 game season: 57, Chelsea (2020–21)
 In a 14 game season: 26, Liverpool (2014)
 Most points in a season while being relegated:
 Performance-based relegation: 
 In a 22 game season: 12, Bristol City (2020–21)
 In a 14 game season: Bristol Academy (2014)
 Relegated due to failure to obtain WSL licence: 16, Notts County (2016) — Notts County folded 2 days before the FA WSL Spring Series began.
 Fewest points in a season while avoiding relegation:
 In a 22 game season: 13, Leicester City (2021–22)
 In a 14 game season: 10, Chelsea, Lincoln Ladies (2013)
 Most points in a season by a team promoted in the previous season: 23, West Ham United (2018–19), Manchester United (2019–20)

Wins 

 Most wins in a season: 
In a 22 game season: 18, Arsenal (2018–19), Chelsea (2020–21), (2021–22)
In a 14 game season: 10, Chelsea (2015)
 Most home wins in a season: 
In a 22 game season: 11, Arsenal (2021–22), Chelsea (2021–22)
In a 14 game season: 5, Chelsea, Manchester City (2015)
 Most away wins in a season: 
In a 22 game season: 9, Arsenal (2018–19)
In a 14 game season: 5, Chelsea (2015)
 Fewest wins in a season:
 In a 22 game season: 2, Bristol City (2020–21)
 In a 14 game season: 0, Everton (2014)
 Fewest home wins in a season: 
 In a 22 game season: 0, West Ham United (2020–21), Birmingham City (2020–21)
 In a 14 game season: 0, Everton (2014), Liverpool (2011, 2012)
 Fewest away wins in a season:
 In a 22 game season: 0, Bristol City (2020–21)
 In a 14 game season: 0, Everton (2014)
Most consecutive wins: 14, Arsenal (2 March 2022 to 6 November 2022)
Most consecutive games without a win: 32, Yeovil Town (May 2017 to November 2018)

 Most consecutive wins within a season: 9, Arsenal (2018–19), Chelsea (2021–22), Manchester City (2021–22)
 Most consecutive wins from the start of a season: 9, Arsenal (2018–19)
 Most consecutive wins to the end of a season: 9, Chelsea (2021–22), Manchester City (2021–22)
 Most consecutive home wins: 11, Manchester City (February 2019 to 5 January 2020)
 Most consecutive away wins: 12, Manchester City (4 July 2016 to 28 January 2018)
 Most consecutive games without a win from the start of a season: 18, Yeovil Town (2017–18)
 Fastest team to reach 100 wins: Manchester City (2014 to 23 March 2022)

Defeats 

 Most defeats in a season: 17, Yeovil Town (2017–18), Leicester City (2021–22), Birmingham City (2021–22)
 Most home defeats in a season: 9, Yeovil Town (2017–18, 2018–19), Birmingham City (2021–22)
 Most away defeats in a season: 10, Leicester City (2021–22)
 Fewest defeats in a season:
In a 22 game season: 1, Chelsea (2020–21), Manchester City (2020–21), Arsenal (2021–22)
 In a 14 game season: 0, Arsenal (2012),
 Fewest home defeats in a season:
 In a 22 game season: 0, Manchester City (2020–21), Arsenal (2021–22), Chelsea (2021–22)
 In a 14 game season: 0, Arsenal (2012),
 Fewest away defeats in a season:
 In a 22 game season: 0, Chelsea (2020–21)
 In a 14 game season: 0, Arsenal (2012), Arsenal (2015), Chelsea (2014)

 Most consecutive games undefeated: 33, Chelsea (10 February 2019 to 31 January 
 Most consecutive home games undefeated: 33, Manchester City (1 April 2018 to 2 May 2021)
 Most consecutive away games undefeated: 39, Chelsea (31 May 2017 to 5 May 2021)
 Most consecutive defeats: 12, Yeovil Town (24 August 2017 to 13 April 2018)

Draws 

 Most draws in a season:
 In a 22 game season: 9, Reading (2020–21)
 In a 14 game season: 6, Bristol Academy (2012), Notts County (2014)
 Most home draws in a season: 
 In a 22 game season: 5, Reading (2020–21)
 In a 14 game season: 4, Birmingham City (2015)
 Most away draws in a season: 
 4, Reading (2020–21)
 4, Bristol Academy (2012), Liverpool (2014)
 Fewest draws in a season:
In a 22 game season: 1, Leicester City (2021–22)
 In a 14 game season: 0, Liverpool (2014)
 Fewest home draws in a season:
In a 22 game season: 0, Brighton & Hove Albion, Chelsea (2020–21), 
 In a 14 game season: 0, Liverpool (2014)
 Fewest away draws in a season:
In a 22 game season: 0, Manchester United (2020–21), Leicester City (2021–22),  Brighton & Hove Albion (2021–22)
 In a 14 game season: 0, Liverpool (2014)
 Most consecutive draws: 5, Birmingham City (30 August 2012 to 15 May 2013)
 Most consecutive games without a draw: 46, Arsenal (21 April 2018 to 8 November 2020)

Goals 
 Most goals scored in a season: 
 In a 22 game season: 69, Chelsea (2020–21)
 In a 14 game season: 46, Liverpool (2013)
 Fewest goals scored in a season: 
 In a 22 game season: 13, Aston Villa (2021–22)
 In a 14 game season: 9, Doncaster Rovers Bells (2011, 2013)
 Most goals conceded in a season: 
 In a 22 game season: 72, Bristol City (2020–21)
 In a 14 game season: 42, Doncaster Rovers Bells (2013)
 Fewest goals conceded in a season: 
In a 22 game season: 10, Chelsea (2020–21), Arsenal (2021–22)
 In a 14 game season: 9, Arsenal (2011)
 Best goal difference in a season: 
 In a 22 game season: +59, Chelsea (2020–21)
 In a 14 game season: +27, Liverpool (2013)
 Worst goal difference in a season: 
 In a 22 game season: -54, Bristol City (2020–21)
 In a 14 game season: -33, Doncaster Rovers Bells (2013)
 Highest finish with a negative goal difference: 
 In a 22 game season: 6th, Brighton & Hove Albion (2020–21), West Ham United (2021–22)
 In a 14 game season: 4th, Birmingham City (2013)
 Lowest finish with a positive goal difference:
 In a 22 game season: 5th, Everton (2020–21), Tottenham Hotspur (2021–22)
 In a 14 game season: 6th, Notts County (2014)
 Most goals scored in a season by a relegated team: 
 In a 22 game season: 18, Bristol City (2020–21)
 In a 14 game season: 12, Bristol City (2015)
 Most goals scored at home in a season: 
 In a 22 game season: 42, Chelsea (2020–21)
 In a 14 game season: 19, Liverpool (2013)
 Fewest goals scored at home in a season: 
 In a 22 game season: 5, Aston Villa (2020–21), Birmingham City (2021–22), Aston Villa (2021–22)
 In a 14 game season: 4, Doncaster Rovers Bells (2012)
 Most goals conceded at home in a season: 
 In a 22 game season: 33, Bristol City (2021-21)
 In a 14 game season: 27, Doncaster Rovers Bells (2013)
 Fewest goals conceded at home in a season:
 In a 22 game season: 4, Chelsea (2021–22)
In a 14 game season: 1, Notts County (2014)
 Most goals scored away in a season: 
 In a 22 game season: 29, Manchester City (2021-21)
 In a 14 game season: 27, Liverpool (2013)
 Fewest goals scored away in a season:
 In a 22 game season: 4, Leicester City (2021–22))
 In a 14 game season: 4, Doncaster Rovers Bells (2011, 2012)
 Most goals conceded away in a season: 
 In a 22 game season: 39, Bristol City (2020–21)
 In a 14 game season: 15, Doncaster Rovers Bells (2013)
 Fewest goals conceded away in a season:
 In a 22 game season: 4, Chelsea (2020–21)
In a 14 game season: 5, Arsenal (2013)
 Most consecutive matches scored in: 59, Chelsea (28 October 2018 to 21 November 2021)
Most different individual goal scorers in one match by a single team: 9, Chelsea (against Bristol City) (2020–21)
 Longest consecutive run of matches without conceding a goal: 10, (Arsenal, 13 March 2021 to 23 October 2022)
Most matches played with 6 or more goals scored in the second half: Arsenal 11-1 Bristol City (2019–20),  Brighton & Hove Albion 0-6 Manchester City (2021–22)
Most shots on target in a match: 22, Chelsea (against Yeovil Town, April 2017) 
First team to score 3 goals in the opening 10 minutes of a game: Chelsea (against Leicester City, March 2022)

Disciplinary 

 Most yellow cards in a season: 39,
Tottenham Hotspur (2021–22)
 Most red cards in a season: 2, 
Reading (2017–18, 2019–20)
Manchester United (2019–20)
Bristol City (2012)
West Ham United (2020–21), (2021–22)
 Most penalties awarded to a team in a season: 6, Manchester City (2017–18), Everton (2020–21)
 Most penalties conceded by a team in a season: 7, Yeovil Town (2017–18)

Attendances 

 Highest attendance, single game: 47,367,  Arsenal 4-0 Tottenham Hotspur (at Emirates Stadium, 24 September 2022)
 Lowest attendance, single game: 105, Liverpool 1-4 Bristol Academy (at West Lancashire College Stadium, 8 April 2012)
 Highest season league average attendance: 3,072 (2019–20)

Top Attendances

Player records

Appearances 

 Most FA WSL appearances: 176, Gilly Flaherty (footballer)
 Most FA WSL appearances as a teenager: 54, Maya Le Tissier
 Most different clubs played for in FA WSL: 7, Lucy Staniforth (Lincoln, Bristol Academy, Liverpool, Sunderland, Birmingham City, Manchester United, Aston Villla)
 Oldest player appearance: 41 years, 134 days, Becky Easton (Liverpool, 2015)
 Youngest player appearance: 16 years, 30 days, Lauren James (Arsenal, 2017–18)
 Most seasons appeared in: 11, Gilly Flaherty, Kerys Harrop, Steph Houghton, Kate Longhurst, Jordan Nobbs (2011 to 2021–22)

 Most wins within first 50 games: 39, Vivianne Miedema, Lia Walti, Guro Reiten

Goals 

 First FA WSL goal: Gilly Flaherty (Chelsea vs Arsenal 13 April 2011)
Fastest FA WSL goal: 12 seconds, Jane Ross (for Manchester City vs Doncaster Rovers Bells) 
Youngest goal scorer: 16 years, 258 days, Lauren Hemp
Oldest goal scorer: 41 years, 87 days, Becky Easton
 Most FA WSL goals: 74, Vivianne Miedema
 Most FA WSL goals at one club: 74, Vivianne Miedema (Arsenal)
 Most goal contributions: 107, Vivianne Miedema
 Most goals in a season: 22, Vivianne Miedema (2017–18)
Most goals in WSL full season debut: 21, Sam Kerr (2020–21)
Most goals in a calendar year: 23, Sam Kerr (2021)
Quickest to reach 50 goals: Vivianne Miedema (in 50 games)
Quickest to reach 100 goal involvements: Vivianne Miedema (in 83 games)
 Most number of teams scored against in a season: 10, Sam Kerr (2021–22)
 Most number of consecutive games scoring against the same opposition: 7, Vivianne Miedema (for Arsenal, against Reading)
 Most different clubs to score for in WSL: 5, Lucy Staniforth (Lincoln, Bristol Academy, Sunderland, Birmingham City, Manchester United)
 Most consecutive games scored in: 9, Bethany England (29 November 2019 to 23 February 2020)
 Most consecutive seasons to score at least 10 goals: 4, Vivianne Miedema (2018–19 to 2021–22)
 Most consecutive seasons to score at least 15 goals: 3, Vivianne Miedema (2018–19 to 2020–21)
 Most consecutive seasons to score at least 20 goals: 2, Sam Kerr (2019-20 to 2021–22)
 Most goals in a calendar month: 10, Vivianne Miedema (December 2019)
 Most penalties scored: 16, Kim Little
Most combined goals between two players: 22, Beth Mead and Vivianne Miedema (2017–18 to 2022–23)
Most combined goals between two players in a season: 12, Fran Kirby and Sam Kerr (2020–21)
Most goals scored as headers: 17, Bethany England
Most goals scored as a headers in one season: 9, Sam Kerr (2020–21)
Players who have scored against every team they have faced: Sam Kerr, Vivianne Miedema

Hat tricks & multiple goal records 

Most Hat-tricks

Other goal records

Most goals scored in a match: 6, Vivianne Miedema (vs Bristol City)
Most goal involvements in a single game: 10, Vivianne Miedema (vs Bristol City)
 Most FA WSL hat-tricks in a season: 3, Vivianne Miedema (2018–19)
Most first half hat-tricks: 2, Vivianne Miedema (vs Bristol City and Tottenham Hotspur), Sam Kerr (vs Birmingham City (2))
 Most hat-tricks against a single club: 2 
Vivianne Miedema vs Bristol City (14 March 2019 and 1 December 2019)
 Bethany England vs Yeovil Town (6 January 2018 and 7 May 2019)
 Rachel Williams vs Liverpool (20 April 2011 and 9 September 2012)
Sam Kerr vs Birmingham City (4 April 2021 and 21 November 2021)

Assists 

 Most WSL assists: 38, Beth Mead
 Most FA WSL assists in a season: 12, Beth Mead (2018–19)
 Most assists in a single WSL match: 4, Vivianne Miedema (vs Bristol City),

Goalkeepers 

 Most clean sheets: 45, Mary Earps
Most clean sheets in one season: 13, Manuela Zinsberger (2021–22)
Longest consecutive run without conceding a goal: 10, Manuela Zinsberger (13 March 2021 to 23 October 2022)

Disciplinary 

 Most red cards: 3, Hawa Cissoko
 Most red cards in a single season: 2, Hawa Cissoko (2021–22)
 Most yellow cards: 26, Remi Allen, Kate Longhurst (2011-2022)

 Most yellow cards in a single season: 7,
Abby Leigh-Stringer (2021–22)
Katie McCabe (2021–22)

Awards 

 Most FA WSL titles: 5, 
Ji So-Yun (2015, 2017–18, 2019–20, 2020–21, 2021–22)
Millie Bright (2015, 2017–18, 2019–20, 2020–21, 2021–22)
Fran Kirby (2015, 2017–18, 2019–20, 2020–21, 2021–22)
Drew Spence (2015, 2017–18, 2019–20, 2020–21, 2021–22)
Most FA WSL Player of the Month Awards: 3,
Vivianne Miedema (October 2018, December 2019, October 2020)
Beth Mead (March 2019, April 2019, September 2021)

Match records 

 Biggest win: Arsenal 11-1 Bristol City (2019–20)
 Biggest home win: Arsenal 11-1 Bristol City (2019–20)
 Biggest away win: Doncaster Rovers Belles 0-9 Liverpool (2013) & Leicester City 0-9 Chelsea (2021–22)
 Biggest aggregate win: Arsenal 15-1 Bristol City (Bristol City 0-4 Arsenal, Arsenal 11-1 Bristol City) (2019–20)
 Biggest loss by reigning champions: Chelsea 0-5 Arsenal (2018–19)
 Highest scoring: Arsenal 11-1 Bristol City (2019–20)

All-time FA WSL table 
The all-time FA Women's Super League table is a cumulative record of all match results, points and goals of every team that has played in the FA WSL since its inception in 2011. Numbers in bold are the record (highest either positive or negative) numbers in each column.

Data does not include the 2017 FA WSL Spring Series.
 Arsenal were deducted 3 points for fielding an unregistered player on 16 September 2013.
 Yeovil Town were deducted 10 points for entering administration on 28 March 2019.
Birmingham City were deducted 1 point for fielding an ineligible player on 7 May 2021.

League or status at 2022–23:

Managers 

 Most FA WSL titles: 5, Emma Hayes (Chelsea — 2015, 2017–18, 2019–20, 2020–21, 2021–22)
 Most FA WSL Manager of the Month awards: 5, Joe Montemurro (October 2018, March 2019, December 2019, March 2021, April 2021), Emma Hayes (October 2019, Jan/Feb 2020, January 2021, March 2022)
 Most FA WSL Manager of the Month awards in a single season: 3, Emma Hayes (Chelsea — 2019–20)
Most wins as manager with a single FA WSL club: 161, Emma Hayes (Chelsea)
 Most promotions to the FA WSL: 1,
 Jonathan Morgan (Leicester City — 2020–21)
Gemma Davies (Aston Villa — 2019–20)
 Karen Hills & Juan Amaros (Tottenham Hotspur — 2018–19)
 Casey Stoney (Manchester United — 2018–19)
 Hope Powell (Brighton & Hove Albion — 2017–18)
 Andy Spence (Everton — 2017)
Willie Kirk (Bristol City — 2016)
Jamie Sherwood (Yeovil Town — 2016)
Glen Harris (Doncaster Rovers Belles — 2015)
Matt Beard (Liverpool - 2021–22)
 Most relegations from the FA WSL: 1,
Matthew Beard (Bristol City — 2020–21)
Vicky Jepson (Liverpool — 2019–20)
 Lee Burch (Yeovil Town — 2018–19)
Emma Coates (Doncaster Rovers Belles — 2016)
Willie Kirk (Bristol Academy — 2015)
Andy Spence (Everton — 2014)
 John Buckley (Doncaster Rovers Belles — 2013)
 Most clubs managed (excluding interim managers): 3, Matt Beard (Chelsea, Liverpool, West Ham United)
 Most games managed: 166, Emma Hayes (Chelsea)

Notes

References 

Women's Super League
Records (superlatives)